Rony Nelson (born January 24, 1989) is a professional American football defensive linemen for the West Michigan Ironmen of the Indoor Football League (IFL). He has also been a member of the Iowa Barnstormers, Bemidji Axemen and the Cleveland Gladiators. He attended the Iowa State University and played for the school's football team.

Early life
Nelson attended Miami Jackson High School, where he was a soccer player before the football coaches recruited him to play. Upon graduation, Nelson enrolled at Yuba College, where he would continue his football career. Nelson earned a scholarship to Iowa State University, where he played 3 years with the Cyclones football team.

Professional career

Iowa Barnstormers
Nelson was assigned to the Iowa Barnstormers of the Arena Football League (AFL), just a few days before their final game of the season. Nelson played linebacker, and recorded one tackle.

Bemidji Axemen
Nelson signed with the Bemidji Axemen in 2014. Nelson recorded 25 tackles and three sacks during his first season with the Axemen. Nelson played in 11 games with the Axemen during the 2015 season, recording 32 tackles.  Nelson re-signed with the Axemen for the 2016 season.

West Michigan Ironmen
Nelson signed with the West Michigan Ironmen for the 2016 season. He would later be placed on the exempt list, but returned to help lead the Ironmen to the 2016 AIF Championship game. Nelson returned to the Ironmen in 2017. On November 8, 2017, Nelson re-signed with the Ironmen for 2018.

Cleveland Gladiators
On February 8, 2016, Nelson was assigned to the Cleveland Gladiators. On March 9, 2016, Nelson was placed on reassignment.

References

1989 births
Players of American football from Miami
American football linebackers
American football defensive linemen
Iowa State Cyclones football players
Iowa Barnstormers players
Bemidji Axemen players
Living people
West Michigan Ironmen players
Cleveland Gladiators players